Hepco Arak F.C. is an Iranian football club based in Arak, Iran. They currently compete in the Iran Football's 3rd Division.

Season-by-season
The table below chronicles the achievements of Hepco Arak F.C. in various competitions since 2009.

Stadium

Hepko Arak play at Imam Khomeini Stadium which was built in 2007. The stadium sports a grass field with the capacity to hold 15000 people. spectators and is owned by the Iranian Physical Education organization.

References

External links
 Fan Site

Football clubs in Iran
Sport in Markazi Province